Roberts Creek Provincial Park is a provincial park in British Columbia, Canada, located northwest of the community of Roberts Creek, between Gibsons and Sechelt.

See also
List of British Columbia provincial parks

References
BC Parks infopage

Provincial parks of British Columbia
Sunshine Coast (British Columbia)
1947 establishments in British Columbia
Protected areas established in 1947